Location search optimization (LSO) is the process of improving the visibility of a website or a webpage by reaching more readers through location-enabled devices. The LSO is a new step in a line of web optimization methods, which began with search engine optimization (SEO) to boost search rankings, and social media optimization (SMO) to make content more sharable. With mobile phones and location-enabled devices becoming the more prevalent way in which consumers access the Internet and search on the Web, LSO is about making content accessible and sharable around a place or location.

Impact 

According to a MarketWatch study, the average consumer is almost two times (90% more) as likely to purchase a product found on a mobile phone than a laptop. It follows that a query is significantly more likely to lead to a purchase, whether in person or online, if the query is conducted closer to a store's physical location. The previous statement applies regardless of whether a user arrives via a search engine, social media, or other traffic source. In extension, paid online advertisements (such as pay-per-click), which often offer location-based advertising, are similarly much more effective than non-location-based advertisements in terms of click through rates, according to several search engine marketing firms.

See also
 Local search engine optimisation
 Social media optimization
 Search engine marketing

References 

Search engine optimization
Internet geolocation